Elections to Tower Hamlets London Borough Council were held on 4 May 2006. The entire council stood for election, and the Labour party retained control.

Election result

Ward results

References
2006 Tower Hamlets election result
Ward results
The battle for Tower Hamlets

2006
2006 London Borough council elections
21st century in the London Borough of Tower Hamlets